A battery management system (BMS) is any electronic system that manages a rechargeable battery (cell or battery pack), such as by protecting the battery from operating outside its safe operating area, monitoring its state, calculating secondary data, reporting that data, controlling its environment, authenticating it and / or balancing it.

A battery pack built together with a battery management system with an external communication data bus is a smart battery pack. A smart battery pack must be charged by a smart battery charger.

Functions

Monitor 
A BMS may monitor the state of the battery as represented by various items, such as:

 Voltage: total voltage, voltages of individual cells, or voltage of periodic taps
 Temperature: average temperature, coolant intake temperature, coolant output temperature, or temperatures of individual cells
 Coolant flow: for liquid cooled batteries
 Current: current in or out of the battery
 Health of individual cells
 State of balance of cells

Electric vehicle systems: energy recovery
 The BMS will also control the recharging of the battery by redirecting the recovered energy (i.e., from regenerative braking) back into the battery pack (typically composed of a number of battery modules, each composed of a number of cells).

Battery thermal management systems can be either passive or active, and the cooling medium can either be air, liquid, or some form of phase change. Air cooling is advantageous in its simplicity. Such systems can be passive, relying only on the convection of the surrounding air, or active, using fans for airflow. Commercially, the Honda Insight and Toyota Prius both use active air cooling of their battery systems. The major disadvantage of air cooling is its inefficiency. Large amounts of power must be used to operate the cooling mechanism, far more than active liquid cooling. The additional components of the cooling mechanism also add weight to the BMS, reducing the efficiency of batteries used for transportation.

Liquid cooling has a higher natural cooling potential than air cooling as liquid coolants tend to have higher thermal conductivities than air. The batteries can either be directly submerged in the coolant or coolant can flow through the BMS without directly contacting the battery. Indirect cooling has the potential to create large thermal gradients across the BMS due to the increased length of the cooling channels. This can be reduced by pumping the coolant faster through the system, creating a tradeoff between pumping speed and thermal consistency.

Computation 
Additionally, a BMS may calculate values based on the below items, such as:

 Voltage: minimum and maximum cell voltage
 State of charge (SoC) or depth of discharge (DoD), to indicate the charge level of the battery
 State of health (SoH), a variously-defined measurement of the remaining capacity of the battery as % of the original capacity
 State of power (SoP), the amount of power available for a defined time interval given the current power usage, temperature and other conditions
 State of Safety (SOS)
 Maximum charge current as a charge current limit (CCL)
 Maximum discharge current as a discharge current limit (DCL)
 Energy [kWh] delivered since last charge or charge cycle
 Internal impedance of a cell (to determine open circuit voltage)
 Charge [Ah] delivered or stored (sometimes this feature is called Coulomb counter)
 Total energy delivered since first use
 Total operating time since first use
 Total number of cycles
 Temperature Monitoring
 Coolant flow for air or liquid cooled batteries

Communication 
The central controller of a BMS communicates internally with its hardware operating at a cell level, or externally with high level hardware such as laptops or an HMI.

High level external communication are simple and use several methods:

 Different types of serial communications.
 CAN bus communications, commonly used in automotive environments.
 Different types of wireless communications.

Low voltage centralized BMSes mostly do not have any internal communications.

Distributed or modular  BMSes must use some low level internal cell-controller (Modular architecture) or controller-controller (Distributed architecture) communication.  These types of communications are difficult, especially for high voltage systems.  The problem is voltage shift between cells.  The first cell ground signal may be hundreds of volts higher than the other cell ground signal.  Apart from software protocols, there are two known ways of hardware communication for voltage shifting systems, optical-isolator and wireless communication.  Another restriction for internal communications is the maximum number of cells.  For modular architecture most hardware is limited to maximum 255 nodes.  For high voltage systems the seeking time of all cells is another restriction, limiting minimum bus speeds and losing some hardware options.  Cost of modular systems is important, because it may be comparable to the cell price. Combination of hardware and software restrictions results in a few options for internal communication:
 Isolated serial communications
 wireless serial communications

To bypass power limitations of existing USB cables due to heat from electrical current, communication protocols implemented in mobile phone chargers for negotiating an elevated voltage have been developed, the most widely used of which are Qualcomm Quick Charge and MediaTek Pump Express. "VOOC" by Oppo (also branded as "Dash Charge" with "OnePlus") increases the current instead of voltage with the aim to reduce heat produced in the device from internally converting an elevated voltage down to the battery's terminal charging voltage, which however makes it incompatible with existing USB cables and relies on special high-current USB cables with accordingly thicker copper wires. More recently, the USB Power Delivery standard aims for an universal negotiation protocol across devices of up to 240 watts.

Protection 
A BMS may protect its battery by preventing it from operating outside its safe operating area, such as:

 Over-charging
 Over-discharging
 Over-current during charging
 Over-current during discharge
 Over-voltage during charging, especially important for lead–acid, Li-ion and LiFePO4 cells
 Under-voltage during discharging, especially important for Li-ion and LiFePO4 cells
 Over-temperature
 Charging while under low temperature
 Over-pressure (NiMH batteries)
 Ground fault or leakage current detection (system monitoring that the high voltage battery is electrically disconnected from any conductive object touchable to use like vehicle body)

The BMS may prevent operation outside the battery's safe operating area by:

 Including an internal switch (such as a relay or mosfet) which is opened if the battery is operated outside its safe operating area
 Requesting the devices to which the battery is connected to reduce or even stop using or charging the battery.
 Actively controlling the environment, such as through heaters, fans, air conditioning or liquid cooling

Battery connection to load circuit 
A BMS may also feature a precharge system allowing a safe way to connect the battery to different loads and eliminating the excessive inrush currents to load capacitors.

The connection to loads is normally controlled through electromagnetic relays called contactors. The precharge circuit can be either power resistors connected in series with the loads until the capacitors are charged. Alternatively, a switched mode power supply connected in parallel to loads can be used to charge the voltage of the load circuit up to a level close enough to battery voltage in order to allow closing the contactors between battery and load circuit. A BMS may have a circuit that can check whether a relay is already closed before precharging (due to welding for example) to prevent inrush currents to occur.

Balancing 
In order to maximize the battery's capacity, and to prevent localized under-charging or over-charging, the BMS may actively ensure that all the cells that compose the battery are kept at the same voltage or State of Charge, through balancing. The BMS can balance the cells by:

 Wasting energy from the most charged cells by connecting them to a load (such as through passive regulators)
 Shuffling energy from the most charged cells to the least charged cells (balancers)
 Reducing the charging current to a sufficiently low level that will not damage fully charged cells, while less charged cells may continue to charge (does not apply to Lithium chemistry cells)

Topologies 

BMS technology varies in complexity and performance:
Simple passive regulators achieve balancing across batteries or cells by bypassing charging current when the cell's voltage reaches a certain level. Therefore, such devices, while certainly beneficial, have severe limitations in their effectiveness.
 Active regulators intelligently turning on and off a load when appropriate, again to achieve balancing. If only the cell voltage is used as a parameter to enable the active regulators, the same constraints noted above for passive regulators apply.
 A complete BMS also reports the state of the battery to a display, and protects the battery.
BMS topologies fall in three categories:
 Centralized: a single controller is connected to the battery cells through a multitude of wires
 Distributed: a BMS board is installed at each cell, with just a single communication cable between the battery and a controller
 Modular: a few controllers, each handling a certain number of cells, with communication between the controllers

Centralized BMSs are most economical, least expandable, and are plagued by a multitude of wires.
Distributed BMSs are the most expensive, simplest to install, and offer the cleanest assembly.
Modular BMSes offer a compromise of the features and problems of the other two topologies.

The requirements for a BMS in mobile applications (such as electric vehicles) and stationary applications (like stand-by UPSes in a server room) are quite different, especially from the space and weight constraint requirements, so the hardware and software implementations must be tailored to the specific use. In the case of electric or hybrid vehicles, the BMS is only a subsystem and cannot work as a stand-alone device. It must communicate with at least a charger (or charging infrastructure), a load, thermal management and emergency shutdown subsystems. Therefore, in a good vehicle design the BMS is tightly integrated with those subsystems. Some small mobile applications (such as medical equipment carts, motorized wheelchairs, scooters, and fork lifts) often have external charging hardware, however the on-board BMS must still have tight design integration with the external charger.

Various battery balancing methods are in use, some of them based on state of charge theory.

See also 
 Battery balancing
 Smart battery
 Battery charger
 Charge controller

References

External links 
 Electropaedia on Battery Management Systems
 NREL Energy Storage Systems Evaluation
 Modular Approach for Continuous Cell-Level Balancing to Improve Performance of Large Battery Packs, National Renewable Energy Laboratory, September 2014
 A Modular Battery Management System for HEVs, National Renewable Energy Laboratory, 2002

Energy conversion
Battery charging
Embedded operating systems